Obereopsis himalayana is a species of beetle in the family Cerambycidae. It was described by Stephan von Breuning in 1971.

Subspecies
 Obereopsis himalayana himalayana Breuning, 1971
 Obereopsis himalayana bhutanensis Breuning, 1975

References

himalayana
Beetles described in 1971